Elections to Antrim Borough Council were held on 17 May 1989 on the same day as the other Northern Irish local government elections. The election used three district electoral areas to elect a total of 19 councillors.

Election results

Note: "Votes" are the first preference votes.

Districts summary

|- class="unsortable" align="centre"
!rowspan=2 align="left"|Ward
! % 
!Cllrs
! % 
!Cllrs
! %
!Cllrs
! %
!Cllrs
! % 
!Cllrs
! %
!Cllrs
!rowspan=2|TotalCllrs
|- class="unsortable" align="center"
!colspan=2 bgcolor="" | UUP
!colspan=2 bgcolor="" | DUP
!colspan=2 bgcolor="" | SDLP
!colspan=2 bgcolor="" | Alliance
!colspan=2 bgcolor="" | Sinn Féin
!colspan=2 bgcolor="white"| Others
|-
|align="left"|Antrim North West
|bgcolor="40BFF5"|36.0
|bgcolor="40BFF5"|2
|18.6
|1
|30.9
|2
|0.0
|0
|14.5
|0
|0.0
|0
|5
|-
|align="left"|Antrim South East
|bgcolor="40BFF5"|47.0
|bgcolor="40BFF5"|4
|31.7
|2
|12.4
|1
|8.9
|0
|0.0
|0
|0.0
|0
|7
|-
|align="left"|Antrim Town
|bgcolor="40BFF5"|47.2
|bgcolor="40BFF5"|4
|18.7
|1
|12.4
|1
|12.3
|1
|4.0
|0
|5.4
|0
|7
|-
|- class="unsortable" class="sortbottom" style="background:#C9C9C9"
|align="left"| Total
|43.7
|10
|24.0
|4
|18.1
|4
|7.0
|1
|5.6
|0
|1.6
|0
|19
|-
|}

Districts results

Antrim North West

1985: 2 x UUP, 1 x SDLP, 1 x DUP, 1 x Sinn Féin
1989: 2 x SDLP, 2 x UUP, 1 x DUP
1985-1989 Change: SDLP gain from Sinn Féin

Antrim South East

1985: 4 x UUP, 2 x DUP, 1 x SDLP
1989: 4 x UUP, 2 x DUP, 1 x SDLP
1985-1989 Change: No change

Antrim Town

1985: 3 x UUP, 2 x DUP, 1 x SDLP, 1 x Alliance
1989: 4 x UUP, 1 x DUP, 1 x SDLP, 1 x Alliance
1985-1989 Change: UUP gain from DUP

References

Antrim Borough Council elections
Antrim